Alf Benison (21 June 1918 – 12 May 1979) was an Australian rules footballer who played for the South Melbourne Football Club and Footscray Football Club in the Victorian Football League (VFL).

Benison played with Camberwell Football Club in 1946.

Notes

External links 

1918 births
1979 deaths
Australian rules footballers from Victoria (Australia)
Sydney Swans players
Western Bulldogs players
Camberwell Football Club players